The 2012–13 Rice Owls men's basketball team representedRice University during the 2012–13 NCAA Division I men's basketball season. The Owls, led by fifth year head coach Ben Braun, played their home games at the Tudor Fieldhouse and were members of Conference USA. They finished the season 5–26, 1–15 in C-USA play to finish in last place. They lost in the first round of the Conference USA tournament to Houston.

Roster

Schedule

|-
!colspan=9| Regular season

|-
!colspan=9| 2013 Conference USA men's basketball tournament

References

Rice Owls men's basketball seasons
Rice